Alaka Das is an artist of classical music of Bangladesh born in Comilla in 1946. She is noted for singing many unconventional raagas (classical music) in state owned media.

Family
Das' father was a classical musician, Pandit Surendra Narayan Das. She learnt all the basics of music from her father.  Her uncle is Sudhin Das, from whom she learnt Nazrul Sangeet for a few days. Her younger brother Manas Kumar Das, Subrata Das and Tapas Kumar Das are also singers of Nazrul Sangeet in Bangladesh.

Early life and career 
Das started her professional music career by enlisting in Bangladesh Betar during 1963. Later, she enlisted in Bangladesh Television during 1967. She is enlisted in both this state owned media as a Senior Artist of classical music and Nazrul Sangeet. After the death of her father, since 1986, she is acting as a Principal of Sangeet Shikhharthee Sammilan, one of the oldest music schools in Bangladesh. This music school was established by Suren Das in 1942 at Talpukur Par, Comilla.

Literature works 
 During 2015, she published a book of classical music named Raag Manjori (রাগ মঞ্জরী).
During 2011, She published the  music book Raag Manjusha as a co-editor along with her brother Manas Kumar Das. This book was written by her father Pandit Suren Das.

Awards and achievement 
 District Shilpakala Padak 2014 
 Songeet Niketan Sommanona 2014
 Binoy Sahitto Sommanona 2013
 Nazrul Sommanona 2011 by Nazrul Sangeet Shilpi Porishod, Dhaka

References 

Bangladeshi women writers
Bangladeshi Nazrul Geeti singers
20th-century Bangladeshi women singers
20th-century Bangladeshi singers
21st-century Bangladeshi women singers
21st-century Bangladeshi singers
1946 births
Living people
Bangladeshi Hindus